Maria McKee is the debut album by American singer-songwriter Maria McKee, released in 1989.

Production
The songwriting was inspired in part by books about the history of vaudeville, as well as by Tennessee Williams plays.

Critical reception

The Washington Posts Joe Brown called the album "stunning", writing that "aside from her luminous singing, the real success story of McKee's solo album is her songwriting, highly developed and ambitious, full of melodic and rhythmic variety." Chris Willman writing for the Los Angeles Times stated the album "presents Maria McKee the person as something of an introspective, even introverted loner reeling from a romantic split." Ira Robbins considered McKee's "lyrics don't reveal any clear artistic mission and Mitchell Froom's overstylized production ... drowns and/or drains her personality out of the album, leaving characterless elegance instead of a strong statement." Oscar Wednesday of Cashbox was disappointed by this record. He wrote: "I really wanted to love this album. As far as I'm concerned Maria McKee is one of the most talented and exciting singers around today. No, honest. But after listening to the album repeatedly, I found myself anything but captivated. Lone Justice's second and final album, 1986's Shelter, was unfocused and awkward, and although this solo outing stands head-and-shoulders above that effort, it too feels a little unnatural."

Terry Staunton, writing for New Musical Express, felt that McKee's decision to work with "the elite of American sessions musicians" produced "astonishing results" and suggested the album "has to be one of the best records of the year". He praised McKee's "honey roast vocals" for "matching the frail passion of Patsy Cline, the fiery soul of Aretha Franklin and the forceful blues of Janis Joplin". Staunton added, "Maria's always been able to pen a good tune and here you'll hear nine of her best." NME placed the album at No. 9 on its 1989 albums of the year list. Ian Gittins of Melody Maker summarised, "Maria McKee is country, is blues, is soul, is rock 'n' roll, but is always one delicious demon possessed by the spirit of her songs. I defy you to hear this and not fall in love."

Track listing
All songs by Maria McKee, except where noted

"I've Forgotten What It Was in You (That Put the Need in Me)" – 3:41
"To Miss Someone" – 3:52
"Am I the Only One (Who's Ever Felt This Way?)" – 2:56
"Nobody's Child" (McKee, Robbie Robertson) – 3:58
"Panic Beach" – 5:55
"Can't Pull the Wool Down (Over the Little Lamb's Eyes)" – 3:45
"More Than a Heart Can Hold" (Bruce Brody, McKee) – 4:29
"This Property Is Condemned" (Brody, McKee, Patrick Sugg, Gregg Sutton) – 4:44
"Breathe" (McKee, Sutton) – 4:39
"Has He Got a Friend for Me?" (Richard Thompson) – 3:32
"Drinkin' in My Sunday Dress" – 3:27

Personnel

Maria McKee – acoustic guitar, guitar, piano, vocals
Alex Acuña – percussion
Bruce Brody – conductor, keyboard, Hammond organ
Shane Fontayne – guitar
Mitchell Froom – keyboard
Heart Attack Horns – horn
Jim Keltner – drums
Tony Levin – bass guitar
Jerry Marotta – drums
Sid Page – concert master
Philip Pickett – recorder, crumhorn
James Ralston – guitar
Marc Ribot – guitar
Jerry Scheff – bass
Greg Sutton – vocals
Richard Thompson – guitar, mandolin
Steve Wickham – fiddle

Production

 Mitchell Froom – producer
 Gary Gersh – executive producer
 Bruce Brody – associate producer
 Tchad Blake – engineer
 Ed Goodreau – assistant engineer
 Mike Kloster – assistant engineer
 Randy Staub – assistant engineer
 Randy Wine – assistant engineer
 Scott Woodman – assistant engineer
 Bob Ludwig – mastering
 Bruce Brody – arranger
 Gabrielle Raumberger – art direction
 Maria DeGrassi – design
 Deborah Frankel – photography

Charts
Album – Billboard (North America)

Singles - Billboard (North America)

References

Maria McKee albums
1989 debut albums
Albums produced by Mitchell Froom
Geffen Records albums